Hậu Lộc is a district (huyện) of Thanh Hóa province in the North Central Coast region of Vietnam. As of 2003 the district had a population of 183,852. The district capital lies at Hậu Lộc.

The village of Phú Điền, in xã Triệu Lộc is the site of the Bà Triệu Temple.

References

Districts of Thanh Hóa province